Einav Kabla (born 27 September 1979) is an Israeli lawyer and politician. She served as a member of the Knesset for the Blue and White alliance.

Biography
Kabla earned a master's degree in law at Bar-Ilan University and specialised in labour relations and pensions. She worked for Minister of Justice Avi Nissenkorn, before becoming director of the Trade Union division of the Histadrut.

Prior to the April 2019 elections Kabla joined the new Israel Resilience Party. When it became part of the Blue and White alliance she was placed thirty-seventh on its list, but the party won only 35 seats. She was given the same spot for the September 2019 elections, again failing to win a seat. Given the thirty-seventh slot again for the March 2020 elections, she again failed to win a seat, but entered the Knesset on 19 June as a replacement for Asaf Zamir, who had resigned his seat under the Norwegian Law after being appointed to the cabinet. She is expected to join Ron Huldai's new party, called The Israelis. She was replaced by Moshe Tur-Paz.

References

External links

1979 births
Living people
Bar-Ilan University alumni
Blue and White (political alliance) politicians
Israel Resilience Party politicians
Israeli lawyers
Israeli trade unionists
Israeli women lawyers
Jewish Israeli politicians
Members of the 23rd Knesset (2020–2021)
People from Ashkelon
Women members of the Knesset